Darudi or Darvadi may refer to:
 Darudi, Sistan and Baluchestan
 Darudi, South Khorasan